Gorbeialdea    is a comarca of the province of Álava, Spain. The capital is Murgia, in the municipality of Zuia.

Municipalities

Notes

References

External links 
 

Comarcas of Álava